A Fever in the Blood is a 1961 American courtroom drama, produced and distributed by Warner Brothers. The film features a roster of the studio's television contract players, often miscast according to the film's producer and screenwriter Roy Huggins in his Archive of American Television interview.  In fact, Huggins later complained that the film's star, Efrem Zimbalist, Jr. was "too young for the role [of the judge] and I said so". The picture, based on the 1959 novel of the same name by a retired Colorado lawyer, William Pearson, also featured Angie Dickinson, Jack Kelly, Don Ameche, Ray Danton, Herbert Marshall, Rhodes Reason, Robert Colbert, Carroll O'Connor (in his film debut), Parley Baer, and Saundra Edwards.  The film was directed by Vincent Sherman, with music by Ernest Gold, cinematography by J. Peverell Marley, and editing by William H. Ziegler.

Plot
Judge Leland Hoffman (Efrem Zimbalist, Jr.) and District Attorney Dan Callahan (Jack Kelly) go on a weekend hunting trip. The two men share something in common; they both will seek their party's gubernatorial nomination. But when socialite Paula Thornwell is found murdered, D. A. Callahan is summoned back to the city to investigate. Because of the high-profile nature of the Thornwall case, Callahan decides to handle the prosecution himself. The victim's estranged husband, industrialist Walter Thornwall (Rhodes Reason), becomes Callahan's prime suspect. Eventually, he is charged with murder. Interestingly, Judge Hoffman is assigned to hear the case.

The pressures of the courtroom turn the otherwise affable Dan Callahan into a ruthless, vindictive prosecutor, determined to win a conviction at any cost. However, at one point, Thornwall's defense attorney (Ray Danton) calls police sergeant Michael Beers (Jesse White) to the witness stand. During his testimony, Beers unethically blurts that the defendant, Thornwall, had once threatened his wife. The defense makes a motion for mistrial, triggering Callahan's immediate objection. After a tense moment of reflection, Judge Hoffman orders Beers' testimony stricken from the record, but he denies the move for mistrial. Later, after the case goes to the jury for a verdict, they decide in favor of conviction, thus paving the way for a Callahan gubernatorial candidacy.

After the trial is over, however, the gardener for the Thornwall estate is found to be Paula Thornwall's actual murderer when he is apprehended by police and confesses. Callahan uses the confession to free Mr. Thornwall as a means of more political self-promotion. Later, when delegates at the party's state convention consider whom to nominate for governor, they wind up rejecting the showboating Callahan in favor of Hoffman, the quiet man of conscience. As a result, the judge is selected to represent the party in the gubernatorial contest.

Cast
Efrem Zimbalist, Jr.	 ...	
Judge Leland Hoffman
Angie Dickinson	 ...	
Cathy Simon
Jack Kelly	 ...	
Dan Callahan
Don Ameche	 ...	
Sen. Alex Simon
Ray Danton	 ...	
Clem Marker (lawyer)
Herbert Marshall	 ...	
Gov. Oliver Thornwall
Andra Martin	 ...	
Laura Mayberry
Jesse White	 ...	
Mickey Beers
Rhodes Reason	 ...	
Walter Thornwall
Robert Colbert	 ...	
Thomas J. Morely
Carroll O'Connor	 ...	
Matt Keenan
Parley Baer	 ...	
Charles 'Charlie' Bosworth
Saundra Edwards	 ...	
Lucy Callahan

Production Notes
Director Vincent Sherman at first considered the story "old-fashioned...with dismal prospects." The script's adapter, Roy Huggins, agreed and "tried to update it wherever possible." Ultimately though, Sherman criticized the casting of TV actors like Jack Kelly and Efrem Zimbalist, Jr., because he felt their presence on screen would "cause audiences to regard the film as merely an enlarged TV program."

Studio boss Jack L. Warner's attitude toward television actors like Jack Kelly who aspired to film stardom was somewhat cynical. He once commented that "naturally they want to get out of TV because the work is not easy. They want to get into features where they can have an easier occupation.". Nevertheless, Warner had to admit that Jack Kelly "was a worker and a contract player [who] gave Jack [Warner] all he was worth." Thus, Warner felt obligated finally to offer him a starring role in this film.

Since A Fever in the Blood had debuted while Jack Kelly was still appearing in the TV western-satire, Maverick, the actor "found himself in two totally different personas at the same time -- one on the small screen, and one on the large screen." In Maverick, he was an easy-going, laid-back gambler on horseback; in Fever, however, he acted the role of an intensely dislikeable politician. Another Maverick cast member, Robert Colbert, who played "Brent Maverick" in two episodes, was also in the cast of Fever. He played the Thornwalls' gardener.

References

External links

1961 films
1961 crime drama films
American black-and-white films
American crime drama films
American political drama films
Film scores
Films based on American novels
Films directed by Vincent Sherman
Films scored by Ernest Gold
Warner Bros. films
Films with screenplays by Harry Kleiner
1960s English-language films
1960s American films